Malopavlovka is a rural locality (a settlement) in Sverdlovsky Selsoviet, Khabarsky District, Altai Krai, Russia. The population was 165 as of 2013. It was founded in 1907. There are 2 streets.

Geography 
Malopavlovka is located 24 km south of Khabary (the district's administrative centre) by road. Malopavlovka is the nearest rural locality.

References 

Rural localities in Khabarsky District